The term "Research Unix" refers to early versions of the Unix operating system for DEC PDP-7, PDP-11, VAX and Interdata 7/32 and 8/32 computers, developed in the Bell Labs Computing Sciences Research Center (CSRC).

History 

The term Research Unix first appeared in the Bell System Technical Journal (Vol. 57, No. 6, Pt. 2 Jul/Aug 1978) to distinguish it from other versions internal to Bell Labs (such as PWB/UNIX and MERT) whose code-base had diverged from the primary CSRC version. However, that term was little-used until Version 8 Unix, but has been retroactively applied to earlier versions as well. Prior to V8, the operating system was most commonly called simply UNIX (in caps) or the UNIX Time-Sharing System.

AT&T licensed Version 5 to educational institutions, and Version 6 also to commercial sites. Schools paid $200 and others $20,000, discouraging most commercial use, but Version 6 was the most widely used version into the 1980s. Research Unix versions are often referred to by the edition of the manual that describes them, because early versions and the last few were never officially released outside of Bell Labs, and grew organically. So, the first Research Unix would be the First Edition, and the last the Tenth Edition. Another common way of referring to them is as "Version x Unix" or "Vx Unix", where x is the manual edition. All modern editions of Unix—excepting Unix-like implementations such as Coherent, Minix, and Linux—derive from the 7th Edition.

Starting with the 8th Edition, versions of Research Unix had a close relationship to BSD. This began by using 4.1cBSD as the basis for the 8th Edition. In a Usenet post from 2000, Dennis Ritchie described these later versions of Research Unix as being closer to BSD than they were to UNIX System V, which also included some BSD code:

Versions

Legacy 
In 2002, Caldera International released Unix V1, V2, V3, V4, V5, V6, V7 on PDP-11 and Unix 32V on VAX as FOSS under a permissive BSD-like software license.

In 2017, Unix Heritage Society and Alcatel-Lucent USA Inc., on behalf of itself and Nokia Bell Laboratories, released V8, V9, and V10 under the condition that only non-commercial use was allowed, and that they would not assert copyright claims against such use.

See also 
 Ancient UNIX
 History of Unix
 Inferno - Another operating system from the same team
 Lions' Commentary on UNIX 6th Edition, with Source Code
 PWB/UNIX - A version of Unix for internal use at Bell Labs for production use

References

External links 

UNIX Evolution (PostScript) by Ian F. Darwin and Geoffrey Collyer
Unix heritage - More links and source code for some Research Unix versions
The Evolution of the Unix Time-sharing System by Dennis M. Ritchie
The Restoration of Early UNIX Artifacts by Warren Toomey, School of IT, Bond University
Full Manual Pages documentation for Research Unix 8th Edition.
List of new features in Research Unix 9th Edition.

Bell Labs Unices
Computing platforms
Discontinued operating systems
Unix variants